EARTH070796LIVE is a live album by Earth.

Track listing

Credits
Dylan Carlson
Adrienne Davies
Ian Dickson
James Plotkin

References

External links
Earth's official website

Earth (American band) live albums
2003 live albums
Or Records live albums